Atputharajah Nadarajah (16 September 1963 - 2 November 1999), commonly known as Ramesh was a Sri Lankan Tamil journalist and politician. He was Chief Editor of  Thinamurasu a Tamil weekly. He was a member of the Sri Lankan Parliament from Jaffna District as a member of the paramilitary  Eelam People's Democratic Party.He criticised his own party EDDP in his newspaper Thinamurasu and supported Tamil nationalism and the LTTE and leading to dispute with his party and leader Douglas Devananda. He was shot dead along with his driver in Colombo on 2 November 1999.

References

1963 births
1999 deaths
Eelam People's Democratic Party politicians
Members of the 10th Parliament of Sri Lanka
Sri Lankan Tamil politicians
Deaths by firearm in Sri Lanka
Assassinated Sri Lankan journalists